Eressa siamica is a moth of the family Erebidae. It was described by Francis Walker in 1865. It is found in Thailand.

References

 

Eressa
Moths described in 1865